

References

External links 
 

2002 births
Living people
Czech decathletes
World Athletics U20 Championships winners